Who We Love is an Irish coming-of-age drama film directed by Graham Cantwell and written by Cantwell and Katie McNeice. It is a feature-length adaptation of Cantwell's 2016 short film Lily. It premiered at the 2021 Galway Film Fleadh.

Cast

Production
Graham Cantwell's 2016 short film Lily screened at film festivals and received IFTA accolades. Cantwell returned to direct and write the feature version with Katie McNeice joining him as a writer. Cantwell also produced Who We Love alongside Edwina Forkin and Alan Fitzpatrick. The American duo the Ray Sisters did the cinematography for the film.

Clara Harte, Dean Quinn, and Amy-Joyce Hastings reprised the leads from the short film. Paul Ronan, Aisling O'Neill, Lynette Callaghan also reprised their supporting roles. Venetia Bowe replaced Leah McNamara as Violet. Also cast were Amy Hughes, Danielle Galligan, Jimmy Smallhorne, and Alison McGirr.

Principal photography took place in and around Dublin, and experienced disruptions due to the COVID-19 pandemic. Filming locations included the Donahies Community School, Dublin City Centre, the George, PantiBar, and Pennylane.

Release
The film had its first screening on 24 July 2021 at the Galway Film Fleadh.

Awards and nominations

References

External links

2021 LGBT-related films
Features based on short films
Films shot in County Dublin
Remakes of Irish films
Irish LGBT-related films
LGBT-related film remakes
English-language Irish films
2020s English-language films